Mallik may refer to:

 Mallik Island in Canada
 Mallik gas hydrate site in Canada
 Mallik, Northwest Territories, see Ice Road Truckers#Season 2
Mallik Rehan Tomb, Sira, a mausoleum in India
Mallik (surname)